Real Carenero is an old shipyard located in Puerto Real in the Province of Cádiz, Andalusia, Spain. It dates to the 15th century, and was built near the Puente Zuazo.

References

Buildings and structures in San Fernando, Cádiz
Shipyards of Spain